Llangelynin station was a single-platform halt on the Cambrian Line, which served the small village of Llangelynin in Gwynedd, Wales. It was opened in 1930 by the Great Western Railway and was known as Llangelynin Halt.

It was closed by British Rail in 1991; all stations had to be lit at night on safety grounds and it was deemed not worth the upgrade. Train services were officially "suspend[ed] ... until further notice" with effect from 18 November 1991; the "unsafe condition of the platform" was given as the reason.  The line is still open, but trains no longer call at the station.

References

Railway stations in Great Britain opened in 1930
Railway stations in Great Britain closed in 1991
Disused railway stations in Gwynedd
Llangelynin, Gwynedd
Former Great Western Railway stations